Clavicorona is a fungal genus in the family Auriscalpiaceae. The genus was first described by Maxwell Stanford Doty in 1947, who included the species C. pyxidata, C. cristata, C. taxophila, and C. candelabrum. E.J.H.Corner added another five species in 1950: C. candelabrum, C. colensoi, C. javanica, C. mairei, and C. tuba. He included C. dichotoma in 1970.

In his 1972 revision of the genus, James Dodd listed 11 species, but most of these have since been transferred to other genera, particularly Artomyces. According to the nomenclatural database Index Fungorum, the genus is monotypic, as the sole remaining valid species is the type, Clavicorona taxophila.

References

Monotypic Russulales genera
Russulales